The 28th Louisiana Infantry Regiment was an infantry regiment from Louisiana that served in the Confederate States Army during the American Civil War. It was also known as Gray's Regiment to differentiate it from the 28th (Thomas') Louisiana Infantry Regiment, which was also numbered as 29th. Raised in 1862 it served in the Trans-Mississippi Theater and along the Gulf Coast until it disbanded in 1865.

History 
The 28th Louisiana was organized at Monroe during April or May 1862, under the command of Colonel Henry Gray. The regiment included ten companies and fielded 902 men when it mustered in. After completing its organization, the regiment moved to Vienna and drilled there for the next few months before being encamped near Milliken's Bend.

Sent to south Louisiana in November to join General Richard Taylor's command, the 28th encamped at Avery Island for a brief period before relocating to Fort Bisland. A detachment from the regiment participated in the 28 June 1863 capture of the Union gunboat Diana on the Atchafalaya River, and Company K was embarked on the gunboat when it reentered Confederate service. After fighting in the Battle of Fort Bisland between 12 and 13 April, the 28th Louisiana proved decisive in the Confederate victory at Irish Bend on 14 April. The regiment then retreated to Natchitoches with Taylor's army, returning to south Louisiana in June. Gray became commander of General Alfred Mouton's brigade during the summer and fall of 1863. With the brigade, the 28th Louisiana marched to Monroe in December and thence to Pineville for camp in January 1864.

When the Red River Campaign commenced in mid-March, the brigade crossed to Alexandria and retreated towards Natchitoches once again. Distinguishing itself in the attack at the Battle of Mansfield on 8 April, the regiment was in reserve with the brigade for most of the day on 9 April during the Battle of Pleasant Hill, being involved in desultory action. In the subsequent Battle of Yellow Bayou on 18 May, the regiment suffered many casualties. With the brigade, it marched to Monroe in August and moved into southern Arkansas. Late in 1864, the brigade returned to Alexandria through Minden. It camped on Bayou Cotile May 1865, when the regiment marched to Mansfield and disbanded there on 19 May, just before Taylor surrendered his command.

Companies
Company A (Bienville Stars) – Bienville Parish
Company B (Marks Guards) – Bossier Parish
Company C – Jackson Parish
Company D (Claiborne Invincibles) – Claiborne Parish
Company E – Winn Parish
Company F (Jackson Volunteers) – Jackson Parish
Company G – Winn Parish
Company H – Bienville Parish
Company I – Jackson Parish
Company K – Winn Parish

Commanders
Col. Henry Gray (promoted to Brigadier General)
Col. Thomas W. Pool

See also
List of Louisiana Confederate Civil War units

References

Citations

Bibliography

External links
Henry Gray's 28th Regiment, C.S.A., Louisiana

Units and formations of the Confederate States Army from Louisiana
1862 establishments in Louisiana
Military units and formations established in 1862
Military units and formations disestablished in 1865